Graham William Phillips is a British YouTuber, freelance journalist and documentary filmmaker,. Phillips formerly worked as a stringer for the Russian state-owned television networks RT (2013–2014) and Zvezda (2014–2015), and from early 2015 on, for his YouTube channel. From March 2022, Phillips has covered the Russian invasion of Ukraine, initially from the Chernihiv area of Ukraine, then from Mariupol, then from Donetsk, and then onto the self-proclaimed Luhansk People's Republic.

Phillips himself maintains his reporting is 'independent journalism'. In 2015, Phillips was awarded a medal for his work by an organisation linked to the Russian Federal Security Service (FSB), the successor to the Soviet KGB. 

In April 2022, Phillips was accused by British MP Robert Jenrick of committing a war crime after interviewing a captured British born Ukrainian soldier Aiden Aslin. Phillips has defended the interview, and stated that Aslin himself 'requested the interview'. In July 2022, the government of the United Kingdom imposed sanctions on him, saying that his work "supports and promotes actions and policies which destabilize Ukraine and undermine or threaten the territorial integrity, sovereignty, or independence of Ukraine.”  Phillips became the first British citizen to be added to the sanctions list, although he has continued to state that he is "reporting the truth" about the war in Ukraine.

Biography 
Phillips was born in Nottingham, England, spending at least some of his childhood in Scotland, attending Perth High School. He graduated from the University of Dundee with a dual degree in philosophy and history in the early 2000s. During his student years, Phillips had started to do some freelance journalist 'faxing articles into The Scotsman'. After university, he moved to London where he worked a number of years for the now-defunct Central Office of Information, as a clerk, reviewing government websites and preparing reports for the Parliament of the United Kingdom, later speaking of his frustration at the mundanity of this work.

In Ukraine (2010–2016) 
Phillips first visited Ukraine in 2009 when he travelled to Dnipropetrovsk for an England match. He then moved to Ukraine in 2010, looking for the chance to 'reboot' his life, and do journalistic work.  He was 30, and initially began working in Kiev as an English teacher. At this time, Phillips started a blog, Brit in Ukraine, with articles on politics, history, life in Ukraine, UEFA Euro 2012 and sex tourism, including entries about prostitutes, call girls, foreign-bride hunters and sex tourists. The blog was renamed to Graham W Phillips and later deleted.

In 2012, Phillips started work in Kyiv as a journalist for What's On magazine. After leaving What's On, Phillips worked as a freelance journalist from Ukraine, publishing several articles, including two for the New Statesman, three for the Kyiv Post and three for Pravda, among others. In November 2012, Phillips' article for Pravda opined about the gloomy atmosphere in Ukraine after the highs of Euro 2012, and worries for the future.

Phillips's work as a freelance journalist in Ukraine often focused on crime, as he covered the murder of Oksana Makar, a Ukrainian woman raped and burned alive, and Barry Pring, a British man killed outside Kyiv. In early 2013, Phillips self-published a book, Ukraine – Men, Women, Sex, Murder, which culminated with his investigation into the death of Barry Pring. The book was removed from sale after legal action by Anna Ziuzina, the woman he accused of Pring's murder.

For his blog in 2012 and 2013, Phillips wrote a series of articles critical of Ukrainian nationalist politician Stepan Bandera and the Ukrainian nationalist party Svoboda, referring to Bandera as a "Nazi", and Svoboda as "neo-Nazis". Phillips was opposed to Euromaidan from the start, in November 2013, and began doing interviews with Russian state channel RT at this time. At this time, Phillips was also doing street interviews across Ukraine, for his YouTube channel. Phillips then went to work part-time for RT as a reporter in Donbas in April 2014, covering the Russo-Ukrainian War, after multiple RT crews were denied entry into Ukraine.

Phillips came to wide attention for his work from the city of Sloviansk. In the course of doing video reports from the beseiged city, Phillips was initially taken captive by both sides. In May 2014, Phillips was captured by the Armed Forces of Ukraine while reporting from Mariupol. After a day in detention, he was released on the condition that he would immediately leave Ukraine. RT expressed outrage over Phillips' treatment.

After covering the 2014 FIFA World Cup in Brazil as a journalist and football fan, Phillips returned to report from Donbas in the summer of 2014, an apparent violation of the terms of his May release. Phillips was swiftly captured by the Armed Forces of Ukraine again at Donetsk International Airport, before being held for three days, and then deported into Poland, banned from Ukraine for three years. Phillips stated that he was maltreated by the Armed Forces of Ukraine during his detention at the airport, while Ukraine accused Phillips of "supporting terrorism" as a "Kremlin propagandist".

Despite his ban, Phillips returned again to Ukraine in August 2014. In November 2014, Phillips was wounded by a shrapnel in the back while reporting from the frontlines of the war in Donbas. In late 2014, Russian channel NTV released a film 'Военкор' (War Correspondent), inspired by Phillips' early experiences reporting in Ukraine. Back in the UK, in April 2015, Phillips attempted to storm into the Museum of Stepan Bandera in London, shouting that it was a 'Nazi collaborator museum', and was escorted from the premises by the police.

In early 2015, Phillips was added to the controversial Ukrainian Myrotvorets site. Phillips continued reporting from Donbas throughout 2015, and 2016, often with controversial results.  In a 17 September 2016 video published by Phillips, he is seen shortly before a prisoner exchange taunting a disabled Ukrainian prisoner of war who had lost both of his arms and sight in a mine blast, sparking outrage in Ukraine. The Kharkiv Human Rights Protection Group called for journalist NGOs to condemn Phillips' actions. Judith Gough, British Ambassador to Ukraine, said that she was appalled by the incident. Ukrainians organised a petition to then UK Prime Minister Theresa May to strip Phillips of his British passport, and ban him from leaving the UK, however the UK replied that they had 'no grounds' to do this.

Across Europe and Russia (2016–2021) 

From 2016 on, Phillips would continue reporting from Donbas, but also began to travel more widely. On 16 March 2016, he was detained in Riga, Latvia for disrupting the Remembrance Day of the Latvian Legionnaires events, shouting that they were 'glorifying fascists', and resisting police orders, after which he was deported to Russia and blacklisted for three years. Latvia’s Interior Minister, Rihards Kozlovskis blasted Phillips for his “provocation” in the Latvian capital. Afterwards, Phillips covered the European Union membership referendum in the UK, openly declaring himself a supporter of Brexit. Despite being banned from Latvia in March, Phillips returned there in June doing what he described as 'Brexit reportage', in which he referred to the Latvian government as 'morons'.

On 2 August 2016, together with German journalist and activist Billy Six, he entered the Berlin office of the investigative journalism organisation Correctiv without permission and demanded an interview with Marcus Bensmann, who was investigating Malaysia Airlines Flight 17. Phillips, who had been conducting his own investigation into MH17, repeatedly accused Bensmann of lying, shouting "Lying press!", while filming the incident, and refusing to leave. Correctiv called the police, however Phillips and Six evaded them.

In January 2017, Phillips was thrown out of the UK Parliament at a 25th anniversary of the establishment of diplomatic relations between the UK and Ukraine, for disruption. He had loudly asked why the United Kingdom was 'supporting Ukrainian shelling of civilian areas of Donbass'.
Later in 2017, Phillips was accused by a Ukrainian prosecutor's office of taking an active role in the information and propaganda activities of the Donetsk People's Republic and the Luhansk People's Republic. Phillips was alleged to have collaborated, and been friends, with separatist leaders Mikhail Tolstykh and Arsen Pavlov. Phillips was known to be friends with Dr. Elizaveta Glinka, and released a film about her in 2017, following her death in December 2016.

At the start of January 2018, Phillips released a film about the legendardy children's camp  Artek in Crimea.  Later in January 2018, Phillips released a film, A Brit in Crimea, in which he took Scottish businessman Les Scott on holiday to the Russian-annexed Crimea. The premiere of the film was held in Moscow, it was then released on Phillips' YouTube channel. Also in January 2018, Phillips was involved in an altercation with a supporter of Aleksei Navalny at a pro-Navalny event in Moscow, with the protester breaking Phillips' camera. Phillips agreed to drop the charges after the protester apologised and made a donation to Phillips' humanitarian aid work in Donbas. 

Phillips was denied accrediation to film the 2018 FIFA World Cup in Russia by FIFA, and so covered the footballing event 'as a football fan'. Back in London, in August 2018, Phillips gatecrashed an exhibition at the Embassy of Georgia in London by Gia Bugadze dedicated to the 10th anniversary of the Russo-Georgian War, and was arrested by police for disrupting the event, shouting that the exhibition was "propaganda" and that its attendants were "NATO zombies". His actions were condemned by the Embassy of Ukraine in London who called on the Foreign & Commonwealth Office to investigate Phillips' "terrorist activity". In early October 2018, Phillips disrupted a press conference with Bellingcat founder Eliot Higgins, accusing him of being a 'NATO agent', and insulting him. 

Also in October 2018, Phillips released a documentary on his YouTube channel, accusing the Ukrainian nationalist politician Stepan Bandera of being a Nazi. He then travelled to his grave, in Munich, and tore down Ukrainian flags which had recently been placed there and placed a placard on the grave reading "Ukrainian Nazi Stepan Bandera is buried here". In response to Phillips' actions, Ukrainian nationalist MP Ihor Mosiychuk stated “This monster (Phillips) should live in constant fear, because if European law enforcement officers do not come after him, then Ukrainian nationalists will come after him.”  The incident was investigated by the Munich Police Department, however no charges were presented against Phillips. 

Further, in October 2018, in Vienna, Phillips was accused by the then Ukrainian ambassador to Austria Olexander Scherba of coming to his premises, calling him a 'fascist', and attempting to provoke him into a fight.

In 2019, Phillips went to  Kosovo, and recorded videos in which he called the country a terrorist state, the Kosovo Liberation Army a "terrorist organization", and Ramush Haradinaj, Hashim Thaçi and other Kosovar leaders "war criminals and terrorists", sparking outrage in Kosovo. Phillips received death threats for his comments and was banned from Kosovo for life. Phillips then did video reports from Serbia, which were deeply critical of the NATO bombing of Yugoslavia. Phillips' reportage included an interview with the father of Milica Rakić.  Also in 2019, Phillips was doing videos from the British overseas territory of Gibraltar.

2020 began with Phillips in Russia's far-eastern city of Vladivostok, doing video reports, a documentary, and praising the city.
The onset of the COVID-19 pandemic saw Phillips back in the UK, describing himself as 'sceptical' about the pandemic, and strongly opposed to compulsory lockdowns and vaccinations. During the pandemic, from the UK, Phillips covered Black Lives Matter events in London, describing himself as an opponent to the movement. Phillips then released a documentary about the Jasenovac concentration camp in Croatia. Later in 2021, Phillips travelled around Siberia doing videos, and documentaries.

Phillips has often reported from Crimea since the Russian annexation in 2014. He has reported extensively from the Crimean Bridge.

Over the years, Phillips has done a series of videos addressing what he has referred to as 'BBC propaganda'.

In addition to his journalistic activities, Phillips has also carried out extensive humanitarian aid work in Donbas, including regular deliveries of humanitarian aid to the children's home in Lutuhyne.

Return to Ukraine (2022-) 

Phillips was in the UK, at his home in London, at the start of the 2022 Russian invasion of Ukraine. He initially headed for Belarus, doing some videos from there, before crossing over into Ukraine, despite his lifetime ban. Phillips returned to report from Ukraine in March 2022, calling support for Ukraine "virtue signalling" for a "fashionable cause" and likened it to the support for Black Lives Matter. In March, Phillips was reporting from the Chernihiv area of Ukraine.

By April, Phillips was back reporting in Donbas, either from Mariupol, or on the theme of Mariupol. On 18 April 2022, Phillips, in Donetsk, interviewed Aiden Aslin, a British-Ukrainian soldier who had been captured by the Russian Armed Forces while serving in Ukrainian military and fighting in Mariupol. Phillips uploaded video of the interview to his YouTube channel, in which Aslin could be seen in handcuffs. British barrister Geoffrey Robertson said the interview could be a violation of international law, saying "coercive interrogation of prisoners of war for propaganda purposes is contrary to the Geneva Conventions". Phillips may face a war crime prosecution as a result of the interview. Former British Cabinet minister Damian Green described him as the modern-day equivalent of World War II Nazi propagandist Lord Haw-Haw.

On 20 April, Phillips was criticized by British Prime Minister Boris Johnson and by Member of Parliament Robert Jenrick in the House of Commons. Johnson accused Phillips of producing propaganda messages and Jenrick said "the interviewer Graham Phillips is in danger of prosecution for war crimes". On 23 April, YouTube announced that it had removed Phillips' interview of Aslin citing privacy violations, and  demonetised his channel.

For his part, Phillips has stated that he has "nothing to hide", adding that Aslin had "requested the interview". "Let anyone serious present any real charges against me, and I'll fully answer all of them – I'm an independent journalist of complete integrity, and absolutely sound of conscience and ethics", he said.

Phillips extensively covered the Battle for Azovstal from Mariupol, up to, and after its capture by Russian forces in mid-May, in addition to general reporting from Mariupol, for his YouTube channel, also his channels on Rumble and Odysee. Phillips moved from Mariupol onto covering Donetsk. In June, while reporting from Donetsk under shelling, Phillips saved two women from under shelling. 

In July 2022, Phillips moved onto the self-declared Lugansk People's Republic, and was reporting from Sieverodonetsk and Lysychansk. In late July 2022, government of the United Kingdom placed sanctions on Phillips and froze his assets. Phillips became the only British-born citizen to date to be sanctioned by his own country. Phillips responded: "I didn't have any opportunity to defend myself, no-one notified me, there are no real charges against me.” Phillips immediately launched an appeal against his sanctions, calling them “ridiculous, illegal and dangerous”. 

Phillips remains under sanctions, and has continued reporting from Donbas. As of 2023, he has been reporting from Soledar.

Awards 
On 1 March 2015, Phillips was reportedly awarded the Medal "Border Brotherhood" by the Border Service, a branch of FSB, Russia's primary security service. Phillips has further been awarded several medals by the separatist republics of Donbas for his journalistic work, including the Medal "For Merit", 2nd class by the head of the self-proclaimed Luhansk People's Republic Igor Plotnitsky.

In November 2020, Phillips was awarded the «Военкор» 'War Correspondent' medal in Moscow. Others to receive this award included Alexander Sladkov, and Alexander Kots.

See also 

Eva Bartlett 
Alexander Kots
Patrick Lancaster
MH17
Anatoly Shariy
Alexander Sladkov
Russian information war against Ukraine

References 

1979 births
Living people
21st-century British journalists
21st-century English non-fiction writers
Alumni of the University of Dundee
English documentary filmmakers
English expatriates in Russia
English expatriates in Ukraine
English male journalists
English war correspondents
English YouTubers
People deported from Latvia
People deported from Ukraine
Pro-Russian people of the war in Donbas
RT (TV network) people
War correspondents of the Russo-Ukrainian War
Writers from Nottingham
YouTube vloggers
English video bloggers